The Free European Song Contest 2020 was the first edition of the Free European Song Contest, organised by the German television network ProSieben and the production company Brainpool TV. It served as an alternative for the Eurovision Song Contest 2020, which was planned to be held in Rotterdam, Netherlands, but was cancelled due to the COVID-19 pandemic.

The show was broadcast on 16 May 2020 at 20:15 CEST on the television channel ProSieben. It was presented by Steven Gätjen and Conchita Wurst. The show was also broadcast on the Austrian private television broadcaster Puls 24 with commentary by Tamara Mascara, Dori Bauer and Patrick Fux. ProSieben Austria and ProSieben Schweiz also took the live feed.

Format

Presenters 
The programme was hosted by two presenters: the German television host Steven Gätjen and the Austrian singer Conchita Wurst, who won the Eurovision Song Contest 2014.

Participants

Score sheet

12 points

Spokespersons 
The spokespersons announced the scores of their respective country's national jury

  – Tamara Mascara
  – Friends of Oonagh
  – Marino Mandekić (father of Vanessa Mai)
  – Valeria (mother of Kate Hall)
  – Heidi Klum and Tom Kaulitz
  – Lion Rosenberg
  – Angelo Kelly
  – Michelle Hunziker
  – Paul (father of Mike Singer)
  The Moon – Michael Herbig as Mr. Spuck
  – Duncan Laurence
  – Lukas Podolski
  – Clarissa Wellenbrink (sister of Nico Santos)
  – Beatrice Egli
  – Hakan Çalhanoğlu
  – Melanie C

See also 
Eurovision Song Contest 2020
Eurovision: Europe Shine a Light
Eurovision 2020 – das deutsche Finale
Der kleine Song Contest
Die Grand Prix Hitliste

Notes

References 

2020 song contests
2020 in German television
2020 in Germany
2020 in music
May 2020 events in Europe
Events in Cologne